One Man may refer to:
 One Man (Mark King album), 1998
 One Man (Tank album), 2002
 One Man (film), a 1977 Canadian film
 One Man (horse), an Irish Thoroughbred racehorse
 Steve Harvey: One Man, a 2001 stand-up comedy special